Kosovo's Partnership with US Government Agency Millennium Challenge Corporation (MCC), was established for the first time in December 2015.

At the annual meeting of this agency, the MCC Board led by US Secretary of State John Kerry, selected Kosovo to develop the 'compact' program, a large grant investment program.

History 
Kosovo began engaging regularly with MCC since 2010. Despite continued support from the US Congress, process stalled due to lack of clear engagement from the Kosovo Government to achieve the eligibility.

Eligibility 
In February 2015, Former President Atifete Jahjaga prioritized the commitment of Kosovo to qualify for MCC funds. She established an inter-institutional Working Group with a focus on improving Kosovo's performance on the MCC scorecard. She appointed Adrian Prenkaj, her Foreign Policy Advisor, to chair the Kosovo-MCC Working Group.

In September 2015, during a visit to the United States, President Jahjaga met in Washington with Beth Tritter, Vice President of the MCC. At this meeting, MCC officials thanked President Jahjaga for her personal engagement and stressed that they were pleased with the level of cooperation MCC had with the Kosovo Working Group and the progress that has been achieved within a very short time.

Partnership Coordinator 
Adrian Prenkaj was appointed by President Jahjaga to lead the Inter-institutional Working Group to improve policy performance of Kosovo in the economic and rule of law indicators. The Working Group was composed of the Ministry of Health, Ministry of Finance, Ministry of Education, the Kosovo Agency of Statistics and a number of specialized UN agencies in Kosovo, such as UNDP, UNICEF, WHO, and UNKT. Within a period of 10 months, Kosovo was able to provide MCC with directly comparable data for four of the six missing UN-sourced indicators and passed the MCC Scorecard in November 2015.

References 

International development agencies
Organizations based in Kosovo
Organizations based in Washington, D.C.